Hotel Reserve is a 1944 British spy film starring James Mason as an innocent man caught up in pre-Second World War espionage. Other cast members include Lucie Mannheim, Raymond Lovell and Herbert Lom. It was based on Eric Ambler's 1938 novel Epitaph for a Spy. Unusually, it was both directed and produced by a trio: Lance Comfort, Mutz Greenbaum and Victor Hanbury. It was shot at Denham Studios with sets designed by the art director William C. Andrews. The film was produced and distributed by the British branch of RKO Pictures.

Plot
In 1938, refugee Peter Vadassy decides to take a holiday at the Hotel Reserve to celebrate both his completion of medical school and his impending French citizenship. When he goes to pick up some photographs at the local pharmacy, he is taken away and questioned by Michel Beghin of French naval intelligence. When his negatives had been developed, some of them turned out to be of French military installations. It is discovered that while the camera is the same make as Peter's, the serial number is different. Peter is released on condition that he find out which other hotel guests have cameras like his.

Peter does some snooping and eavesdrops on a suspicious conversation between Paul Heimberger and the hotel's proprietor, Madame Suzanne Koch. He searches Heimberger's room and finds several passports, all with different names and nationalities. Heimberger catches him in the act, but eventually matters are straightened out. Heimberger explains that he was originally a Social Democratic newspaper publisher who was anti-Nazi and been sent to a concentration camp for two years. After he was released, he joined an underground movement against the German regime.

Peter spots his camera in the pocket of a dressing-gown belonging to Odette and Andre Roux, a couple on their honeymoon. Andre first tries to bribe Peter into giving him the negative and, when that fails, threatens him with a pistol. The police arrive at that moment and arrest Peter for espionage.

The Rouxs leave the hotel, but find Heimberger trying to disable the hotel's car. Andre shoots him dead and the couple speed off to Toulon, unaware that they are being tracked by the police. Beghin had known the identity of the spies all along and merely used Peter to further his true goal; to find out who the Rouxs are reporting to. The spy ring is captured. Andre gets away, but is caught on a roof by Peter. Andre slips and falls to his death.

Cast
James Mason as Peter Vadassy
Lucie Mannheim as Madame Suzanne Koch
Raymond Lovell as Robert Duclos, a hotel guest given to exaggeration
Julien Mitchell as Michel Beghin
Herbert Lom as Andre Roux
Martin Miller as Walter Vogel
Clare Hamilton as Mary Skelton, a hotel guest who is attracted to Peter. A sister of Maureen O'Hara, her real name was Florrie Fitzsimons. This was her only film appearance.
Frederick Valk as Emil Schimler, alias Paul Heimberger
Patricia Medina as Odette Roux
Anthony Shaw as Major Anthony Chandon-Hartley, a guest
Laurence Hanray as Police Commissioner (as Lawrence Hanray)
David Ward as Henri Asticot, a guest
Valentine Dyall as Warren Skelton
Joseph Almas as Albert, the waiter (as Josef Almas)
Patricia Hayes as Servant (waitress) 
Hella Kürty as Hilda Vogel 
Ivor Barnard as P. Molon, the pharmacist 
Ernst Ulman as Detective in Black Suit

Critical reception
The Radio Times noted, "this subdued thriller, set just before the Second World War, is lifted by James Mason's performance as a 'wronged man'," and concluded, "The plot has enough suspense and intrigue built in, but this movie only fitfully comes to life as Mason sets out discover who the real villain is"; Dennis Schwartz found it "a visually attractive film, though hampered because it's so slow moving"; whereas Leonard Maltin thought more highly of the piece, finding it a "Suspenseful, moody film."

References

External links

1944 films
British black-and-white films
British spy films
Films based on British novels
RKO Pictures films
Films directed by Lance Comfort
Films set in 1938
Films set in France
Films set in hotels
Films shot at Denham Film Studios
1940s spy films
1940s British films